Carrigaline Farmhouse Cheese is a maker of semi-soft cheese made from cow's milk in Carrigaline, County Cork in Ireland. The O'Farrell family have produced cheeses on their farm in County Cork since 1988 using milk from their Friesian cow herd. The O'Farrell family business has since grown into a producer of artisan cheeses which have won several accolades and international cheese awards.

The producers recommended that the cheese be matured for 12 weeks before eating.

Carrigaline exports approximately 20% of their cheese to Europe and the US, and their cheese is also sold domestically in supermarkets and independent retailers.
The company's products have received several awards including bronze, silver and gold medals at the British Cheese Awards, silver medals at the International Cheese Awards, and gold (in the smoked cheese category) of the World Cheese Awards.

Range
Carrigaline produce a variety of cheeses:
 Natural
 Garlic and herbs
 Smoked
 Blueberry
 Cranberry
 Dillisk Seaweed

References

External links
 

Dairy products companies of Ireland
Cheesemakers
Cow's-milk cheeses
Irish cheeses